Sagittariidae is a family of raptor with one living species—the secretarybird (Sagittarius serpentarius) native to Africa. This single extant species, has effected the fossil record of the group by ‘pulling’ the temporal range of the family to the present, an artifact called the Pull of the Recent. 

German naturalists Otto Finsch and  Gustav Hartlaub established the taxon name as a subfamily—Sagittariinae—in 1870. Although their term postdated Gypogeranidae of Vigors (1825) and Serpentariidae of Selys Longchamps (1842), the genus name Sagittarius (described in 1783) had priority over Gypogeranus Illiger, 1811 and Serpentarius Cuvier, 1798.

A genus Pelargopappus is known from Miocene deposits in France. The genus Amanuensis is known from Miocene deposits in Africa.

References

Bird families
Birds of prey
Oligocene first appearances
Accipitriformes